The Diocese of Canterbury is a Church of England diocese covering eastern Kent which was founded by St. Augustine of Canterbury in 597. The diocese is centred on Canterbury Cathedral and is the oldest see of the Church of England.

The Report of the Commissioners appointed by his Majesty to inquire into the Ecclesiastical Revenues of England and Wales (1835) noted the net annual revenue for the Canterbury see was £19,182. This made it the wealthiest diocese in England.

Bishops
The diocesan bishop is the Archbishop of Canterbury, presently Justin Welby. However, because of his roles as metropolitan bishop of the Province of Canterbury, Primate of All England and "first bishop" of the worldwide Anglican Communion, the archbishop (whose primary residence is at Lambeth Palace in London) is often away from the diocese. Therefore, his suffragan bishop, the Bishop of Dover (presently Rose Hudson-Wilkin), is in many ways empowered to act almost as if she were the diocesan bishop.

The diocese had from 1944 to 2009 a second locally focussed suffragan bishop, the Bishop of Maidstone (this version of the post was discontinued in November 2010), who had a similar though subordinate role to that of the Bishop of Dover. Two suffragans have nominal sees in the diocese — the Bishops of Ebbsfleet and Richborough, who are provincial episcopal visitors with a wider focus than the diocese.

Besides the Archbishop and the Bishop of Dover, three honorary assistant bishops supervise and officiate. Alternative episcopal oversight (for parishes in the diocese who reject the ministry of priests who are women) is provided by the provincial episcopal visitor (PEV), the Bishop suffragan of Richborough, Norman Banks. There are three honorary assistant bishops licensed in the diocese:
2003–present: Michael Turnbull, retired former Bishop of Durham and Bishop of Rochester, lives in Sandwich.
2008–present: Richard Llewellin, retired former Bishop at Lambeth (chief of staff for the Archbishop at Lambeth Palace) and former Bishop of Dover, lives in Canterbury.
2009–present: Graham Cray, retired Archbishops' Missioner and fresh expressions Team Leader and former Bishop suffragan of Maidstone lives in Harrietsham.

Diocesan structure 
For organisational purposes, the diocese is divided into three archdeaconries, containing a total of fifteen deaneries, which are further subdivided into parishes: Canterbury Diocese comprises 204 parishes organised in 101 legal benefices.

See also
John Wallis Academy — school in Ashford sponsored by the diocese

References

External links
 
Church of England Statistics 2002 
Diocese of Canterbury in the Province of Canterbury

 
597 establishments
Culture in Canterbury
Canterbury
Canterbury
6th-century establishments in England